The Sierra Prieta is a  long mountain range in central-northwest Arizona. The range is the mountainous region west of Prescott, with prominent Thumb Butte, a volcanic plug, on the city's west perimeter.

The range is attached to the northwest of the Bradshaw Mountains, and Granite Mountain, a recreation site, as well as a rockclimbing location, is part of the range's northeast section, overlooking Williamson Valley, further northeast.

The Sierra Prieta range is adjacent the northwest perimeter of the Arizona transition zone, mostly known by its perimeter Mogollon Rim.

Description
Sierra Prieta is a mostly northwest by southeast section of mountains. The highest peak in the south is Mount Francis, which borders the Bradshaw Mountains; Arizona State Route 89 traverses between the two mountain ranges.

The range highpoint is Granite Mountain, anchoring the range's N & NNE; it is separated from the central section by Little Granite Mountain,  to the southwest, and by Tonto Mountain, which is due west. Two other peaks form the range's center, West Spruce Mountain, and Williams Peak, .

Routes
Besides Arizona 89 going southwest from Prescott between the Bradshaw Mountains, County 10 rises to Iron Springs, (Iron Springs Pass) in the range's north. It is often used as a shorter route through the lower elevation Skull Valley during winter snowstorms.

Notable 
The Sierra Prieta range is known in cowboy camps around the world as "The Sierry Petes" a colloquial and period pronunciation of the name made famous in the cowboy poem by the same name but more widely known as "Tyin' A Knot In The Devil's Tail" by Arizonan, Gail Gardner.

References

 Lucchitta, 2001. Hiking Arizona's Geology; Part 2, Arizona Transition Zone, Graphic, w/text, Hikes 18–26. Ivo Lucchitta, c 2001, Mountaineers's Books. 272 pages, 41 Hikes. (Transition zone: Hikes 18–26, p. 143–182.) (softcover)

External links
 West Spruce Mountain, summitpost, (coordinates)

Arizona transition zone mountain ranges
Mountain ranges of Yavapai County, Arizona
Mountain ranges of Arizona
Prescott National Forest